The 1951 Delta State Statesmen football team was an American football team that represented Delta State Teachers College (now known as the Delta State University) as an independent during the 1951 college football season. In their fourth year under head coach Gene Chadwick, the team compiled a 1–8 record.

Schedule

References

Delta State
Delta State Statesmen football seasons
Delta State Statesmen football